Cavitation is the formation of vapour cavities in a liquid.

Cavitation may also refer to:

 Cavitation (embryology), the formation of cavities in an organ
 Cavitation (lung), an air pocket in the lung
 Cavitation (bone), an area of dead bone
 Cavitation (elastomers), the unstable expansion of a microscopic void in a solid elastomer under the action of tensile hydrostatic stresses
 Cavitation, a void in tissue resulting from penetrating trauma